Tomasz Zamoyski (1594-1638) was a Polish-Lithuanian nobleman and magnate.

Tomasz Zamoyski may also refer to:
 Tomasz Antoni Zamoyski (1707–1752), Polish nobleman
 Tomasz Franciszek Zamoyski (1832–1889), Polish nobleman
 Tomasz Józef Zamoyski (1678–1725), Polish nobleman
Tomasz Zamoyski (1861–1935), Polish count, owner of Jabłoń and Iwie, son of August and Elfryda née Tyzenhauz , husband of Ludmiła née Zamoyska, father of Elżbieta, Elfryda and August .
 Jan Tomasz Zamoyski (1912-2002), Polish political activist